Peltodoris nobilis, commonly called the sea lemon, false sea lemon, or the noble dorid, is a species of colorful sea slug, a dorid nudibranch, a shell-less marine gastropod mollusk in the family Discodorididae.

This species was previously placed in the genus Anisodoris and was known for a long time as Anisodoris nobilis. Subsequently it was known as Diaulula nobilis.

This animal gives off a pleasant  citrus smell when it is handled, and this (along with its yellow coloration) is what is responsible for the common name "sea lemon". Its diet includes Mycale adhaerens, the purple scallop sponge

Distribution
This species occurs in the Eastern Pacific Ocean from Alaska to Baja California. It eats sponges.

Description
This nudibranch is variable in color, from a very pale yellow through a rich yellow, to a rather dark orange. The gill rosette is tinged with white at the tips.

The dorsum is covered in tubercles. There are a number of dark spots on the dorsum, but never on the tubercles themselves. These dark spots vary a lot in number from one individual to the next.

This animal can grow to be as large as 200 mm, or nearly 8 inches in length.

References

External links
 Behrens D.W., 1980, Pacific Coast Nudibranchs: a guide to the opisthobranchs of the northeastern Pacific, Sea Challenger Books, Washington
  Dayrat B. 2010. A monographic revision of discodorid sea slugs (Gastropoda, Opisthobranchia, Nudibranchia, Doridina). Proceedings of the California Academy of Sciences, Series 4, vol. 61, suppl. I, 1-403, 382 figs.
 Sea Slug Forum, species fact sheet: 
 Slug Site: 

Discodorididae
Gastropods described in 1905